Folketing elections were held in Denmark on 16 June 1903.

Campaign
Nine of the 114 seats were uncontested, of which seven were won by the Venstre Reform Party and two by the Social Democratic Party.

Results

References

Elections in Denmark
Denmark
Folketing
Denmark